O, ce veste minunată is a Christmas carol, sung primarily in Romanian-speaking communities and countries. Like many other traditional songs, there are many versions of it. For instance, some have "Viflaim" for Bethlehem, some have "S-a născut Mesia" (The Messiah was born). The song is attributed to Dumitru Kiriac-Georgescu (1866–1928), who founded the Romanian traditional music.

Lyrics 

The lyrics and melody of this song are public domain.

Romanian 

O, ce veste minunată!
Lângă Viflaim se arată

Cerul strălucea, îngerii veneau
Pe-o raza curată.

Că la Betleem Maria,
Săvârșind călătoria
Într-un mic sălaș, lângă-acel oraș,
A născut pe Mesia.

Pe Fiul în al Său nume,
Tatăl L-a trimis în lume.
Să se nască, și să crească,
Să ne mântuiască.

Literal English 

O what wonderful news!
Is shown to us in Bethlehem!
Today has been born, the One without a beginning,
As the Prophets foretold!

That in Bethlehem Mary,
Having completed the trip,
In a little space, near that town,
She bore the Messiah

His Son in God's Own Name,
The Father has sent into the world!
To be born and to grow,
To save us all!

Melody

Recordings 
 Dana Dragomir album 'Frost' 2014
 Dalma Kovacs
 Elena Gheorghe
 Paula Seling
 Ștefan Bănică Jr.
 Inna (released with "I Need You for Christmas")
 Lucy Monciel

See also
 List of Christmas carols

External links 
 

Christmas carols
Romanian songs
Inna songs
Paula Seling songs
Elena Gheorghe songs
Year of song unknown